Pawly Pets: My Animal Hospital is a video game by Ubisoft and Focus Multimedia for the Nintendo DS and Windows. The game is about an animal hospital, and the player is a veterinarian, with an optional name. The title of the clinic is customizable. It can teach players about the different kinds of diseases that pets can get, and about the instruments that a real vet would use. It is also a virtual way to learn what a vet would do. There are many animals with the same name, so there is a chance of a glitch, being that there are two animals in an enclosure with the same name. There are three different difficulty levels, easy, medium and difficult. For first time users, easy level is recommended.

The game was created for young children, and it is rated a 3+ (as shown in the infobox) and so does not include any blood, or view of cuts or anything similar. All of the animals move around in a normal way, showing no signs of illness.

Synopsis 

The player is a vet, and have transformed an old, run-down farmhouse into a vets clinic. The first animals that start coming in will be rabbits. In an open-ended game, the rabbit enclosure will already be built, whereas in a scenario (only the first level) the player will have to have them built before in order to look after rabbits with more serious problems. Players will also need to build cat, dog, pig, and horse enclosures. The horse and foal enclosure can only be built after building the horse clinic, where the player diagnoses the horses. In the DS version, the player can also look after and treat tortoises.

Many of the animals only have minor problems, such as fleas or long claws, etc. Others, however, will have more major problems, things like heart disease or poisoning. These animals will need to stay in the hands of the player until they can be sent home, which requires the player to look after them for a few days. Depending on the type of problem they have, they may stay in the hospital for a short or long period of time (e.g. an animal with toothache would only have to stay for one day whereas an animal with heart disease would have to stay for four days). While looking after them, the player will have to keep an eye on their health status. If their health gets too low, they will be taken to somewhere else, and the player's reputation will go down. The player will need to feed the animals, by buying food from a shop. This food comes in three different portions: normal feed, premium feed and super premium feed. The normal feed is the cheapest in the shop. The player will also need to play with, pet and give follow up treatment to the pets when necessary. Without these things, the animal's health will go down. If the player diagnoses the pet incorrectly, the diagnosis step must be repeated until the problem is correctly identified.

Whilst looking after the animals, the player needs to look after the vet too. She needs to eat, and at the end of every day, sleep. If the energy meter is low, the player can get something to eat from the fridge. The vet can eat a snack, 'something', or a proper meal. The bigger the meal is, the higher the energy meter rises. The vet also needs to keep her fitness meter high. This can be done by sleeping in the bed, with an option to sleep from two to eight hours. The player can also have the vet rest on the sofa for a quick fitness boost. The two meters gradually decrease during the day, and bubbles will appear at the side of the screen with icons inside to tell the player if the vet is very hungry or very tired. The vet also has other meters, which are represented by dots. These show how much the vet has done of something, such as the play meter. These meters do not go down.

To look after more animals, the player will need to build more enclosures, and extend existing ones. There is one enclosure for each type of animal, and the bigger it is, the more animals can be kept in it. Each enclosure has two extensions, and with each extension provides an extra item that can optionally be placed in the enclosure. The player can also buy toys for the animals to give them a bigger play meter boost when played with. Finally, the player can buy additional furniture to put in the living space, reception and clinics. These include a TV, chairs for the reception and medicine cabinets for the clinics. Books can be bought at the shop; there are five books for each animal, and they must be bought and read in the right order. When the player has read all five books on the animal, a certificate will appear on the wall of the reception. For every three books that are read, a dot appears on the education meter.

When the hospital starts to become very busy, and there are many animals to look after, it is a good idea to hire help from a man called Jack, who will care for the animals when told to. His meters are similar to the vet's, except he will automatically eat when hungry, and to fill the 'dot meters' he must read books. There is also a horse called 'the mother mare' who, when bought, will live in the horse enclosure and can be taken for rides. If she is neglected, the game is over.

See also 
Pawly Pets: My Animal Centre in Africa

2007 video games
Focus Multimedia games
Medical video games
Nintendo DS games
Single-player video games
Ubisoft games
Windows games